Chilekovo is a rural locality (a settlement) in Chilekovskoye Rural Settlement, Kotelnikovsky District, Volgograd Oblast, Russia. The population was 348 as of 2010. There are 11 streets.

Geography 
Chilekovo is located 39 km northeast of Kotelnikovo (the district's administrative centre) by road. Nebykov is the nearest rural locality.

References 

Rural localities in Kotelnikovsky District